The Blue Kite is a 1993 drama film directed by Tian Zhuangzhuang. Though banned by the Chinese government upon its completion (along with a ten-year ban on filmmaking imposed on Tian), the film soon found a receptive international audience. Along with Zhang Yimou's To Live and Chen Kaige's Farewell My Concubine, The Blue Kite serves as one of the quintessential examples of China's Fifth Generation filmmaking, and in particular reveals the impact the various political movements, including Anti-Rightist Movement and Cultural Revolution, had upon directors who grew up in the 1950s and 1960s.

The film won the Grand Prix at the Tokyo International Film Festival, and Best Film at the Hawaii International Film Festival, both in 1993.

Plot

The story is told from the perspective of a young boy (铁头, Tietou, literally meaning 'iron head') growing up in the 1950s and 1960s in Beijing. Three episodes – Hundred Flowers Campaign, the Great Leap Forward and the Cultural Revolution – show the family members evolving, e.g. from the real father, the "loving patriarch," to the protective but unemotional stepfather.

Father
The first episode, entitled "Father," begins with a wedding between Lin Shaolong and Chen Shujuan in the early 1950s, shortly after the Communist victory. The wedding draws the whole neighborhood, a happy moment that will soon serve as a stark contrast with the years to come. The house and courtyard are shown in a warm bright light as children play happily together.

The couple soon give birth to a son, Tietou, meaning "iron head." In these early years Tietou's father creates for him a blue kite, a symbol that will remain throughout the film as a sign of better days. The father meanwhile, who works in a library, unbeknown to him, submitted "advice" through a well-meaning colleague to the Party as per the Hundred Flowers Campaign. Another colleague, Li, also named in this document, was coerced into giving statements against Lin. Meanwhile, Chen Shujuan's brothers and sister find themselves swept up by the events of the day:  Her older brother, an army pilot, begins to lose his eyesight, and loses his girlfriend to powerful party leaders seeking her company; her youngest brother leads a "critique of the party" that he feels is in line with the "Hundred Flowers Campaign"; while their oldest sister, a revolutionary from China's civil war, seeks to keep them in line with party doctrine and party thinking. This soon returns to haunt all of them as the Hundred Flowers movement is followed by the Anti-Rightist Movement. We soon find out that Shujuan's older brother was going blind, and will soon be forced to leave the party. The girl he loved also resigned over her refusal to meet with senior party members in clandestine affairs. Without given cause, simply that she was flaming "counter revolutionary thoughts", she was taken away to prison. Shujuan's youngest brother, an art school student, was called to task for his "critique" of the party and shown standing before his fellow students as they rally against him.

Shaolong's workplace has convened a meeting on the issue of who they will have to report to the Communist Party as a "rightist" in order to meet Mao's quota. The father quickly leaves for the bathroom. When he returns, all eyes are on him, it is clear who his colleagues have selected. Realizing his terrible mistake of leaving, the father briefly mistreats his son. Tietou, just a small boy, is still bitter when his father is sent to a work camp. Shujuan's youngest brother was also sent to a reeducation camp.  The chapter ends when Tietou's mother receives a letter; his father has been killed by a falling tree.

Uncle
The second episode of the film is entitled "uncle" and deals with Tietou's mother's courtship by Li, her husband's former colleague, and subsequent remarriage to "Uncle" Li. Li felt haunted by his role in sending his friend to the work camp which resulted in Lin's death.  Li spent every moment helping out the mother and child, and every penny in easing their distress in the rapidly declining society.

The episode begins with a group picture during a wedding, with the men wearing blue work uniforms. Much of the episode's palette seems to follow this opening trope as both the courtyard and house are shown in a cold blue. Uncle Li cares for the boy's material needs and desires but it soon grows clear that his health is failing. Li wants to become a party member, and is working feverishly at his job. Soon, malnutrition during the Great Leap Forward takes its toll and Uncle Li dies due to his poor health.

Stepfather
No wedding ceremony, no feelings shown at all. This marriage is just to save the mother and son from poverty, and to give them protection. They move in with the stepfather (Lao Wu). The house is so big that everyone has their own room, no family life at all.

Meanwhile, the Cultural Revolution is about to break forth, led by adolescents seeking to "rebel" against those who seek to rein them in: their parents, teachers, and even party members the central government deemed dangerous. The stepfather, a prominent party member about to be disgraced, worries about saving his wife and stepson and does what he can to provide a safe life for them before it is too late. He offers them money and to divorce Shujuan. Perhaps unable to see another husband taken from her, Shujuan returns to her husband's home as he's being lifted out of his home by the rebelling Red Guards. The last scenes are of Tietou's mother being dragged away by Red Guards, who also beat Tietou. At the end, the boy is lying on the ground, bloodied. In a voice-over, he tells of his stepfather's death from a heart attack; his mother is sent to the work camps, but his own fate is left unknown. The camera pans out from his bruised body as he lies there looking up to see a broken blue kite hanging in the tree.

Themes
 
The film shows a series of patriarchal figures in Tietou's life. Each of the fathers somehow offends the party, and each fails to provide a happy life for his family. Many symbols are used to show that the party is usurping the father, the mother and the family itself. The more the party takes control, the less emotions are shown and the more depressed the characters are.  The party is also shown reaching out for those who seek to undermine it and no one can escape: not the student, not the ordinary librarian, and not even the soldier who fought for those very ideals.

Banned in mainland China
Because of its content, it was banned in mainland China by the government.

Year-end lists 
 2nd – Yardena Arar, Los Angeles Daily News
 6th – Kenneth Turan, Los Angeles Times
 7th – Roger Ebert, Chicago Sun Times
 Top 10 (not ranked) – Howie Movshovitz, The Denver Post
 Honorable mention – William Arnold, Seattle Post-Intelligencer

Awards
 Hawaii International Film Festival, 1993
 Best Feature Film
 Tokyo International Film Festival, 1993
 Grand Prix
 Best Actress Award – Lü Liping
 Independent Spirit Awards, 1995
 Best Foreign Film nomination

See also
 List of banned films
 Hibiscus Town — another Cultural Revolution drama, made several years prior to The Blue Kite.

References

External links
 
 
 

1993 films
1993 drama films
Chinese drama films
Hong Kong drama films
1990s Mandarin-language films
Political drama films
Films about communism
Films about the Cultural Revolution
Films set in Beijing
Films set in the 1950s
Films set in the 1960s
Films directed by Tian Zhuangzhuang
Films critical of communism